Violent World: A Tribute to the Misfits is a tribute album to the American horror punk band Misfits released in 1997 by Caroline Records. It features primarily punk rock bands performing cover versions of Misfits songs from the band's early era, 1977 to 1983.

Track listing

References

1997 compilation albums
Caroline Records compilation albums
Horror punk compilation albums
Albums produced by Don Fury
Albums produced by Steve Evetts